KS Oils Limited is an Indian fast-moving consumer goods company in the edible oil market.

K S Oils has near to 3000 employees spread over its 7 manufacturing plants, marketing offices and plantations in India, Malaysia, Indonesia and Singapore.

History
KS Oils was a privately held entity till 1990 when it became deemed public company. On 8 February 1993, the company became a public listed company. The main object of the company is manufacturing and dealing in oils, vegetable oils and fats, products of plantation, soaps and allied products.

Brands
KS Oils owns some of the big brands in the mustard oil segments. Brands held by the company include:
 Kalash Mustard oil
 Double Sher Mustard oil
Indian Idol singers Amit Paul and Emon Chatterjee feature in the Double Sher TV Advt.
 Crystal Clear (Soybean Oil)
 KS Soya and KS Gold refined oil
 KS Gold Vanaspati
 KS Gold Plus Vanaspati

These brands have strong leadership position in their categories.

Awards
 One of the India's most Investor Friendly Companies - Rankings by Business Today
 Featured among ET500 for the year 2007, 2008 - Rankings by The Economic Times
 Fastest Growing Companies in India, 2007 - Ranking by Business Today, Rank 5.
 Solvent Extractors Association of India's Award for Highest processor of Rapeseed Oil Cake in India for the years 1994-1995, 1999-2000, 2004–2005, 2005-2006, 2006-2007, 2007–2008.
 GLOBOIL India Awards - GLOBOIL Emerging Company of the year 2006 for KS Oils and Oilman of the year award for Mr. Rameshchand Garg.

Controversy
KS Oils has defaulted on SBI loans worth Rs. 596 crores, and is second on SBI's loan write-off list.

References

External links
Official Website of KS Oils Limited

Chemical companies of India
Food and drink companies of India
Companies based in Madhya Pradesh
1985 establishments in Madhya Pradesh
Food and drink companies established in 1985
Morena
Companies listed on the National Stock Exchange of India
Companies listed on the Bombay Stock Exchange